CPML may refer to:

Science & Technology 
 Commodity product Markup Language (CpML), an industry standard used in wholesale energy trading
 Convolutional Perfectly Matched Layer, a grid truncation technique in the finite-difference time-domain method as a part of numerical mathematics
 Cyto-Plasmic Promyelocytic Leukaemia (cPML), a form of the promyelocytic leukemia protein

Business 
 Central Pennsylvania Multiple Listing, a MLS-based system for real estate agents in Pennsylvania, US

Other  
 Communist Party (Marxist–Leninist) (United States)